Amyand David Buckingham  (28 January 1930 – 4 February 2021) born in Pymble, Sydney, New South Wales, Australia was a chemist, with primary expertise in chemical physics.

Life and career
David Buckingham obtained a Bachelor of Science and Master of Science, under Professor Raymond Le Fevre, from the University of Sydney and a PhD from the University of Cambridge supervised by John Pople. He was an 1851 Exhibition Senior Student in the Physical Chemistry Laboratory at the University of Oxford from 1955 to 1957, Lecturer and then Student (Fellow) at Christ Church, Oxford from 1955 to 1965 and University Lecturer in the Inorganic Chemistry Laboratory from 1958 to 1965. He was Professor of Theoretical Chemistry at the University of Bristol from 1965 to 1969. He was appointed Professor of Chemistry at the University of Cambridge in 1969.

He was elected a Fellow of the Royal Society in 1975, a Fellow of the American Physical Society in 1986 and a Foreign Associate of the United States National Academy of Sciences in 1992. He was a member of the International Academy of Quantum Molecular Science. Buckingham was elected to the Australian Academy of Science in 2008 as a Corresponding Fellow.

He was awarded the first Ahmed Zewail Prize in Molecular Sciences for pioneering contributions to the molecular sciences in 2006.

He won the Harrie Massey Medal and Prize in 1995.

He also played 10 first class cricket matches for Cambridge University and Free Foresters between 1955 and 1960, scoring 349 runs including two half-centuries at an average of 18.36.  He was President of Cambridge University Cricket Club between 1990 and 2009.

Professor Buckingham finished his career as Emeritus Professor of Chemistry at the University of Cambridge, United Kingdom and Emeritus Fellow at Pembroke College, Cambridge.

He died seven days after his 91st birthday.

Scientific contributions
Professor Buckingham's research has focussed on the measurement and understanding of the electric, magnetic and optical properties of molecules; as well as on the theory of intermolecular forces.

Initially he worked on dielectric properties of liquids, such as dipole moments of molecules in both solution and gas phases. He developed the theory of the interaction of molecules in liquids and gases with external electric and magnetic fields. In 1959, he proposed a direct method of measurement of molecular quadrupole moments of molecules (measured in buckinghams), which he demonstrated experimentally in 1963 on the carbon dioxide molecule. In 1960, he developed theories of solvent effects on nuclear magnetic resonance (NMR) spectra and vibrational spectra of molecules. In 1962 he considered the effect on NMR spectra of molecular orientation in a strong electric field, and developed a method to determine the absolute sign of the spin-spin coupling constant. In 1968, he determined the first accurate values of hyperpolarizability using the Kerr effect. In 1971 Buckingham and Laurence Barron pioneered the study of Raman optical activity, due to differences in the Raman scattering of left and right-polarized light by chiral molecules.

In the 1980s, he showed the importance of long-range intermolecular forces in determining the structure and properties of small molecule clusters, with particular applications in biological macromolecules. In 1990 he predicted the linear effect of an electric field on the reflection of light at interfaces. In 1995, he proved that the sum of the rotational strengths of all vibrational transitions from the ground state of a chiral molecule is zero.

See also
 Buckingham (unit)

References

External link

2021 deaths
1930 births
Commanders of the Order of the British Empire
Fellows of the Royal Society
Fellows of Pembroke College, Cambridge
Fellows of Christ Church, Oxford
Academics of the University of Bristol
Australian chemists
Members of the International Academy of Quantum Molecular Science
Theoretical chemists
Faraday Lecturers
Foreign associates of the National Academy of Sciences
Australian cricketers
Cambridge University cricketers
Free Foresters cricketers
Members of the University of Cambridge Department of Chemistry
University of Sydney alumni
Fellows of the Australian Academy of Science
Fellows of the American Physical Society
Alumni of Corpus Christi College, Cambridge